USS Fulmar (AMS-47/YMS-193) was a  acquired by the U.S. Navy for use in World War II. Her task was to clear minefields in coastal waterways.

Fulmar was laid down, 31 October 1942 by the Greenport Basin and Construction Co., Long Island, Greenport, New York; launched, 2 January 1943; completed, 28 June 1943; commissioned USS YMS-193; reclassified as a motor minesweeper and named Fulmar (AMS 47), 1 September 1947; and reclassified as a coastal minesweeper (Old), MSC(O)-47, 7 February 1955.

Fulmar was struck from the Naval Register, 1 October 1968 and sold. Her ultimate fate is unknown.

References

External links 
 

YMS-1-class minesweepers of the United States Navy
Ships built in Greenport, New York
1943 ships
World War II minesweepers of the United States
Cold War minesweepers of the United States